Konrad Poprawa (born 4 June 1998) is a Polish professional footballer who plays as a centre-back for Śląsk Wrocław.

Football

Early years

Poprawa started playing football in his early years with GKS Ksawerów, Ksawerów being a small village close to the city of his birth, Łódź. He joined GKS in 2009 at the age of 11, staying there until 2014 when he joined ŁKS Łódź. Poprawa played at ŁKS for two seasons playing with the under 19's team. Over the course of these two seasons he made 28 appearances in the Junior Leagues. Poprawa's big move came when he joined Śląsk Wrocław in 2016, who were playing in the top Polish division. In his first season with Śląsk, he played 15 games and scored 4 goals for the under 19's team, while also playing 9 times for the Śląsk second team in the III liga, scoring one goal.

Senior career

Poprawa's senior debut came in 2017 for the Ekstraklasa game against Wisła Płock, helping the team to a convincing 4-1 win. He made a further two first team appearances for Śląsk in the 2017-18 season, being an unused substitute for the remaining games of the spring round.  

For the 2018-19 season, Poprawa joined Wigry Suwałki in the I liga on loan for the season. After failing to get any game time in the first months, the loan was terminated, with Poprawa joining Skra Częstochowa on loan for the rest of the season. Skra played in the II liga for the 2018-19 season, but Poprawa struggled to break into the first team playing only 11 games, the majority of which came after the winter break.

References

External links

1998 births
Living people
Polish footballers
Association football defenders
Śląsk Wrocław players
Wigry Suwałki players
Skra Częstochowa players
Ekstraklasa players
II liga players
III liga players
Footballers from Łódź